John Michael McNamara (August 12, 1878 – November 26, 1960) was an American clergyman of the Roman Catholic Church. He served as an auxiliary bishop of the Archdiocese of Baltimore  from 1927 to 1947 and of the Archdiocese of Washington  from 1947 until his death in 1960.

Biography

Early life 
John McNamara was born in Baltimore, Maryland, to Michael and Margaret (née McNeally) McNamara. He studied at Loyola College and at St. Mary's Seminary, both in Baltimore. 

McNamara was ordained to the priesthood for the Archdiocese of Baltimore by Cardinal James Gibbons on June 21, 1902. He then did pastoral work in the archdiocese and in the Diocese of Wilmington.  McNamara was the founding pastor of St. Gabriel Parish in Washington, D.C. in 1919.

Auxiliary Bishop of Baltimore 
On December 16, 1927, McNamara was appointed Auxiliary Bishop of Baltimore and Titular Bishop of Eumenia by Pope Pius XI. He received his episcopal consecration on March 29, 1928 from Archbishop Michael Joseph Curley, with Bishops William Joseph Hafey and Thomas Joseph Toolen serving as co-consecrators, at the Cathedral of the Assumption. He served as vicar general of the archdiocese, and was named an Assistant at the Pontifical Throne on March 30, 1947.

Auxiliary Bishop of Washington 
On November 15, 1947, McNamara was appointed as an auxiliary bishop of the newly erected Archdiocese of Washington. He assumed the role of vicar general in Washington as well.

Throughout his ecclesiastical career, he actively supported the canonization of Mother Elizabeth Ann Seton, and ordained nearly 2,000 men to the priesthood. McNamara continued to serve as an auxiliary bishop until his death at age 82.

Bishop McNamara High School bears the name of the bishop.

See also

References

1878 births
1960 deaths
Roman Catholic bishops in Maryland
20th-century Roman Catholic bishops in the United States
Loyola University Maryland alumni
St. Mary's Seminary and University alumni